This is a list of football players who represented the India national football team or India national youth football teams (such as India U-23, U-20 and U-17) in international football, and were born outside India.

The following players:
have at least one game for the (senior or youth male) India international team; and
were born outside India.

This list includes players born abroad alongside those, who have become naturalized Indian citizens. The players are ordered per modern-day country of birth; if the country at the time of birth differs from the current, this is indicated with a subsection.

Players

Italy
 Aniket Bharti

Japan
 Arata Izumi

Kuwait
 Khalid Jamil

Nepal
 Shyam Thapa
 Abneet Bharti

Kingdom of Sikkim
 Born before 1975 merger with India

 Hishey "Jerry" Basi
 Pem Dorji
 Puspa Chhetri

Tanzania
 Arnold Rodrigues

United Arab Emirates
 Sahal Abdul Samad

List of countries

See also

History of Indian football
List of India international footballers
List of Indian football players in foreign leagues

References

External links

 
Football in India
Lists of India international footballers
Association football player non-biographical articles